Pennarasi is a 1955 Tamil-language film starring A. P. Nagarajan and P. Kannamba. It was released on 14 April 1955.

Plot 
The film is about a queen whose kingdom was protected by the commander. While the commander is loyal to the queen, her minister is a wily person. A Chieftain of a neighbouring land is trying to grab the queen's kingdom with the connivance of the wily minister. The chieftain sends his court dancer who is also his mistress to seduce the minister. The commander, who is the hero in the film, has a lover. Many interesting situations and incidents takes place that forms the story of the film. At the end, the villains are exposed. The commander marries his sweetheart.

Cast 
The list was adapted from an article of the film's review.

Male cast
Nalvar Nagarajan as the Commander Vikraman
M. N. Nambiar as the Minister Vijayasimman
P. S. Veerappa as the Chieftain Marthandan (Sornapuri)
E. R. Sahadevan as Mathisegaran
V. M. Ezhumalai as
A. Karunanidhi as Veeran
O. A. K. Thevar as Magudapathi
 P. S. Vengadachalam as Chief Minister Chithrasenan
M. A. Ganapathi
R. Pakkirisami as Alahalan
S. M. Thirupathisami

Female cast
P. Kannamba as the Queen
P. R. Sulochana as the court dancer Jeeva
Suryakala as Manjula (Commander's lover)
E. V. Saroja as Mallika
C. T. Rajakantham as Commander Vikraman's mother
P. Kanaka as Ranjitha
M. K. Vijaya as

Production 
The film was produced by M. A. Venu who also made Sampoorna Ramayanam, Mangalyam, Town Bus, Panam Panthiyile and Mudhalali. This film, Pennarasi, was produced at Central Studios, Coimbatore.

Soundtrack 
The music was composed by K. V. Mahadevan. Lyrics were penned by A. Maruthakasi and Ka. Mu. Sheriff. Playback singers are: T. M. Soundararajan, Thiruchi Loganathan, S. C. Krishnan, M. S. Rajeswari, Jikki, P. Leela, U. R. Chandra and P. Kanaka.

References

External links 
 

1950s Tamil-language films
1955 films
Films directed by K. Somu
Films scored by K. V. Mahadevan
Films with screenplays by A. P. Nagarajan
Indian black-and-white films